The Wedding Palace (Багт көшги) is a civil registry building in Ashgabat, Turkmenistan. It was constructed by Turkish company Polimeks. It was built in 2011, commissioned by the Government of Turkmenistan.

Description 
It is a three-tier structure, each side of which has the form of an eight-pointed star. A cube that towers over large columns forms its upper stage and incorporates a ball with a diameter of 32 meters—a symbolic planet Earth with the image of Turkmenistan. Four entrances to the building symbolize the four directions.

The interior of the palace is made in Turkmen style. The center has six rooms for registration of marriage. Three are wedding hall for events, two of which hold 500 and one holds 1000. On the ninth floor of the Palace—in the central part of the "ball"—is the Golden Hall for weddings, called "Shamchyrag".

The Palace hosts seven banquet rooms, 36 shops and two cafes, providing all the necessary items of wedding services, including dress shops, decorations, car rental, ethnic jewelry, photo studio, beauty salon and 22-room hotel. The third and fourth floors hold administrative offices and a library. Under the building is a closed parking lot for 300 cars.

References

External links 
 Ashgabat Wedding Palace

Buildings and structures in Ashgabat
Palaces in Turkmenistan
Government buildings completed in 2011